The 8th Chamber of Deputies is the assembled legislature of the lower house of the Parliament of the Czech Republic following the election held on 20 and 21 October 2017. All 200 Members of Parliament (MPs) were elected to serve a 4-year term.

Current composition 
Below is a graphical representation of the Chamber of Deputies showing a comparison of party strengths as it was directly after the 2017 election. The graphic is not a seating plan.

List of elected MPs

References 

2017
2017 Czech legislative election